Cale D. Hulse (born November 10, 1973) is a Canadian former professional ice hockey player in the National Hockey League.  He was a defenceman.

Playing career
Hulse was drafted in the 3rd round (66th overall) in the 1992 NHL Entry Draft by the New Jersey Devils. In 1995, he was on the American Hockey League's Calder Cup championship team, Albany River Rats.  On February 26, 1996, he was traded to the Calgary Flames with Tommy Albelin and Jocelyn Lemieux for Phil Housley and Dan Keczmer.  On March 14, 2000, he was traded with a 3rd round draft pick in the 2000 NHL Entry Draft to the Nashville Predators for Sergei Krivokrasov.

Hulse signed as a free agent with the Phoenix Coyotes on July 10, 2003.  On October 8, 2005, he was traded with Michael Rupp and Jason Chimera to the Columbus Blue Jackets for Geoff Sanderson and Tim Jackman.

On February 28, 2006, he was traded to the Flames for Cam Severson. Hulse was invited to the Carolina Hurricanes' 2006 training camp as a depth fill-in, but was cut before the season started.

Personal life
Hulse married actress Gena Lee Nolin on September 9, 2004, at the Royal Palms Resort and Spa in Phoenix, Arizona. Their son, Hudson Lee Hulse, was born on April 15, 2006, in Scottsdale, Arizona. On December 3, 2008, Hulse and Nolin had their second child, a girl named Stella Monroe. Hulse has a daughter, Caia, from a previous relationship, and is step-father to Gena Lee's son Spencer from her former marriage.

Career statistics

Awards and honours

References

External links

Cale Hulse interview with Tara Hitchcock of KTVK Phoenix

1973 births
Living people
Albany River Rats players
Battle of the Blades participants
Calgary Flames players
Calgary Royals players
Canadian ice hockey defencemen
Canadian people of Swedish descent
Columbus Blue Jackets players
Nashville Predators players
New Jersey Devils players
Phoenix Coyotes players
Portland Winterhawks players
Saint John Flames players
Ice hockey people from Edmonton
New Jersey Devils draft picks